Hit Dem Folks is a dance trend created in 2015 popular within American hip-hop. The move involves crossing the arms twice, raising them in a 'U' shape, and bending them inwards. The move has been done by athletes, celebrities, and other well-known figures. "Hit dem folks" gained recognition through online video-sharing platforms like YouTube and Instagram, and it remains a frequently-used gesture among dancers on social media. Some dancers known for "hitting dem folks" are Ayo and Teo.

Origins 
The dance is said to have originated in Columbus, Georgia, in the early 2010s. After being adopted by the Atlanta dance scene, it quickly became a viral sensation. Late rapper, Bankroll Fresh, is recognized as one of the first artists to popularize it, with his song "Walked In" becoming a well-known song to "hit dem folks" to.

A person "hits dem folks" by doing a series of arm movements followed by the "hit," in which they raise their arms, bend them towards the center of the body, and raise one leg. The dance is typically done to rap music, with the "hit" landing on a certain beat of a hip-hop track.

Similar trends 
“Hit dem folks” is part of a larger movement in hip-hop culture that involves creating new dance moves to go along with rap songs, and promoting them via social media. The invention of video-sharing platforms like YouTube enabled the spread of these dance moves. Artists would also market their songs by having a unique dance to go along with it, a notable example being Soulja Boy’s song, “Crank That,” and its music video, being one of the first viral dance trends to be proliferated via YouTube. See also:

 Hit the Quan
 Juju on that Beat
 Milly Rock.

References 

Hip hop dance
2010s fads and trends
Dance